Anolis monensis, the Mona anole, is a species of lizard in the family Dactyloidae. The species is found on Isla de Mona in Puerto Rico.

References

Anoles
Endemic fauna of Puerto Rico
Reptiles of Puerto Rico
Reptiles described in 1904
Taxa named by Leonhard Stejneger